Saint-Hilaire-la-Gérard is a former commune in the Orne department in north-western France. On 1 January 2019, it was merged into the commune Mortrée.

See also 

 Communes of the Orne department
 Parc naturel régional Normandie-Maine

References 

Sainthilairelagerard